"Jeeves' Arrival" is the first episode of the first series of the 1990s British comedy television series Jeeves and Wooster. It is also called "In Court after the Boat Race" or "Jeeves Takes Charge". The episode aired in the US on 11 November 1990 on Masterpiece Theatre.

Background 
Adapted from "Jeeves Takes Charge" (collected in Carry On, Jeeves), and "Scoring off Jeeves" and "Sir Roderick Comes to Lunch" (both collected in The Inimitable Jeeves).

Cast
 Bertie Wooster – Hugh Laurie
 Jeeves – Stephen Fry
 Aunt Agatha – Mary Wimbush  
 Bingo Little – Michael Siberry
 Honoria Glossop – Elizabeth Kettle 
 Sir Roderick Glossop – Roger Brierley
 Lady Glossop – Jane Downs
 Oswald Glossop – Alastair Haley  
 Sir Watkyn Bassett – John Woodnutt
 Lord Rainsby – Jason Calder
 Eustace Wooster – Ian Jeffs
 Claude Wooster – Hugo E. Blick
 Barmy Fotheringay Phipps – Adam Blackwood
 Drones Porter – Michael Ripper
 Cabbie – Tim Barker

Plot

This episode opens with Bertie Wooster being fined the sum of £5 after stealing a policeman's helmet on the night of the Oxford-Cambridge boat race. He arrives at his apartment, still hungover, when Jeeves arrives. Wooster agrees to take him on as his valet, after Jeeves makes a concoction that instantly cures his hangover.

Bertie Wooster's Aunt Agatha orders him to marry Honoria Glossop, whom Agatha believes will "reform" him. Bertie, not enamoured with the idea, finds that his friend Bingo Little is infatuated with her.  In order to get Honoria's love, Bingo Little produces a plan which involves Bertie Wooster throwing Honoria's little brother Oswald in the river. Bingo Little would save the boy in order to get her love. But the plan to get Bingo and Honoria together fails. Bertie has to jump into the water to rescue Honorias's brother, and Honoria falls in love with Bertie Wooster. His capable new valet Jeeves steps in with a plan to convince Sir Roderick and Lady Glossop that their potential son-in-law is unfit to marry their daughter.

See also
 List of Jeeves and Wooster characters

References

External links

Jeeves and Wooster episodes
1990 British television episodes